Chiliadenus is a genus of flowering plants in the family Asteraceae.

 Species
 Chiliadenus antiatlanticus (Emb. & Maire) Gómiz - Morocco
 Chiliadenus bocconei Brullo - Malta
 Chiliadenus candicans (Delile) Brullo - Libya, Egypt, Israel, Jordan
 Chiliadenus glutinosus (L.) Fourr. - Spain, Balearic Islands, Gibraltar, Andorra
 Chiliadenus hesperius (Maire & Wilczek) Brullo - Morocco
 Chiliadenus iphionoides Brullo - Egypt, Israel, Jordan, Syria, Lebanon
 Chiliadenus lopadusanus Brullo - Sicily 
 Chiliadenus montanus (Vahl) Brullo - Egypt, Israel, Jordan, Saudi Arabia
 Chiliadenus rupestris (Pomel) Brullo - Libya, Algeria, Morocco
 Chiliadenus sericeus (Batt. & Trab.) Brullo - Libya, Algeria

References

Asteraceae genera